The McCall MacBain Arts Building (also known as the Arts Building, formerly the McGill College Building) is a landmark building located at 853 Sherbrooke Street West, in the centre of the McGill University downtown campus in Montreal, Quebec. The Arts Building is the oldest existing building on campus, and was designed in Classical style by John Ostell beginning in 1839. The building's central block and east wing were completed in 1843, and the west and north wings were completed in 1861 and 1925, respectively, after involving multiple architects, including Alexander Francis Dunlop and Harold Lea Fetherstonhaugh. Today the Arts Building is made up of three distinct wings around a central block: Dawson Hall (east), Molson Hall (west), and Moyse Hall (north), and currently houses the Department of French Language and Literature, Department of English and the Department of Art History and Communication Studies. The building also hosts lectures for several other departments from the Faculty of Arts.

In April 2019, the building was renamed the McCall MacBain Arts Building in recognition of a private donation of C$200 million, the largest single gift to a university in Canadian history, from the McCall MacBain Foundation.

History
In 1811, the founder of McGill University, James McGill, bequeathed his forty-six acre estate, Burnside Place, which stretched from Doctor Penfield Avenue to a few streets south of Sherbrooke Street as well as £10,000, to the Royal Institution for the Advancement of Learning, which governed the education system in Quebec at the time. He made his bequest with the understanding that within ten years of his death, it would create a university, otherwise his heirs would acquire the property. This ultimately took a lot longer than planned, as the Royal Institution for the Advancement of Learning did not have trustees or a board and thus could not execute the provisions of the will. Finally, in 1837, with McGill's bequest and property deed in hand, the Royal Institution decided to build the first building on campus. That year, the Royal Institution held a competition for the design of what would later be known as the McGill College Building (today the Arts Building). In 1839, the competition was won by John Ostell, a British architect known for designing the Old Custom House (1836) in Montreal, and soon after, construction began on the McGill College Building.

By 1843, the central and east sections of the building were constructed in Classical style, but a lack of funds prevented any further construction. At the time, the central block contained the kitchen, steward's residence, a room for the Governors' council, college hall, a library, and classrooms. The east section contained the chapel and vice-principal's residence. The Royal Institution had planned to build a two-storey portico with Doric columns but could not at the time. Due to the building not being properly finished, the roof leaked, the rooms were cold and dark, there were rats roaming the halls and several windows were broken. In order to raise money to finish the project, the Royal Institution sold land south of Sherbrooke Street. In 1852, the city began construction on McTavish reservoir, and in the process, inadvertently ended up sending large boulders into the roof of the McGill College Building. This resulted in the staff and students having to relocate.

In 1855, the new principal of McGill College, Sir William Dawson arrived to a disorderly campus. Dawson, who lived in the building's east wing, decided to fix up the campus, and hired J.W. Hopkins to add the portico with Doric columns that the Royal Institution had previously intended to build in front of the central block, though made out of wood. Dawson convinced Sir William Molson to donate to construct the McGill College Building's west wing, which would be called Molson Hall. The west wing was built in 1861 by William Spier, and held the convocation hall, classrooms, chemistry labs, a museum and a library. In 1888, Alexander Francis Dunlop made major alterations to the building's east wing for the Science Department. At some point within the next few decades, as McGill continued to grow, the McGill College Building was renamed the Arts Building. In 1921, Ramsay Traquair, the director of the McGill School of Architecture at the time, designed the McGill flag and presented it to the university. As of 2020, it continues to fly above the Arts Building.

In 1925, Harold Lea Fetherstonhaugh and J. Cecil McDougall were hired to renovate the Arts Building. They transformed the central block's first floor into a large lobby with columns made of black marble, and a floor made of pink Tennessee marble. The construction was done by Anglin-Norcross Ltd. of Montréal. They also introduced the colored globe lamp that hangs today in the entrance lobby surrounded by the zodiac signs. Behind the central block, Moyse Hall was added, containing a large lecture theatre with bas-reliefs and ten electric chandeliers made of bronze. The wooden portico that Hopkins added was taken down and rebuilt out of yellow stone, while an additional storey was added to Molson Hall. The exterior of the Arts Building has remained more or less the same since then. The Arts Building's east wing, once simply known as "the wing", was named Dawson Hall in 1947, after its occupant Sir John William Dawson. Today it serves as one of the university's administration facilities.

In 2019, the building was renamed the McCall MacBain Arts Building after the university received a private donation of C$200 million, the largest single gift to a university in Canadian history, from John and Marcy McCall MacBain of the McCall MacBain Foundation.

Architecture

The McCall MacBain Arts Building uses a mix of Classical architectural elements, such as a front portico with a pediment held up by Tuscan columns. The Latin motto of the university, Grandescunt Aucta Labore ("By work, we believe all things increase and grow" in English) is inscribed in the building, representing the classical and liberal education of the university around the time it was founded. The interior lobby of the building contains black marble columns, a pink marble floor and oak furnishings, and along with the Greek Revival architecture give evidence to the great culture of the British Empire. The wooden cupola atop the central block, from which the McGill flag flies, can be seen from the Roddick Gates and is an instantly recognizable icon of the university. The tomb of James McGill can also be seen in front of the Arts Building.

Restoration
In 2016, the Arts Building underwent significant restorations by the Montreal architectural firm EVOQ Architecture, in order to preserve its heritage. The building had significantly deteriorated and the restoration project involved the selective dismantling and consolidation of two sections of the wall, unit re-anchoring, the replacement of multiple stones and the restoration of 44 windows. The front portico was also stabilized and the stone masonry completely restored in order to recreate the original appearance while also ensuring the structural stability of the building.

See also
McGill University buildings
Leacock Building
Macdonald-Harrington Building
McGill School of Architecture

References

John Ostell buildings
McGill University buildings
University and college buildings completed in 1843
Greek Revival architecture in Canada
1843 establishments in Canada
1843 establishments in Quebec